The College of Saint John the Evangelist of Rushworth, commonly called Rushworth College, was a college in the present-day village of Rushford in Norfolk. It was founded in 1342 by Edmund Gonville, the original founder of Gonville and Caius College, Cambridge, as a small community of priests dedicated to saying chantries for Gonville and his heirs. The college existed until the English Reformation when its lands and endowment were subsumed into Gonville Hall.

References

Gonville and Caius College, Cambridge
1342 establishments in England
1542 disestablishments in England
Educational institutions established in the 14th century